Cross v. United States may refer to:
Cross v. United States (1871), involving Congressional reference of a government contract dispute
Cross v. United States (1916), regarding remuneration for clerks of the court for the copying and docketing of naturalization claims